Australians in Saudi Arabia are a sizeable community consisting mainly of expatriates. Their population is estimated to be anywhere up to 5,000 with the majority based in major commercial centres such as Riyadh and Jeddah. Most Australian citizens in Saudi Arabia tend to be occupational-oriented and are employed mainly in the health, education, construction and technology sectors. There are approximately 1,000 Australians who live in Jeddah alone, a city which serves as the country's main port and economic hub. In addition, thousands of Australian Muslims travel and stay in Saudi Arabia each year, often intending to visit the two holiest cities of Islam, Mecca and Medina. Many expatriates in Saudi Arabia are attracted to what they refer to as "the good life", including large salaries and tax-free jobs, consistent weather and a comfortable social life within their housing compounds.

Throughout the years, however Australian and Saudi Arabian relations have moved further from purely expatriate towards both countries having a strong investment portfolio and mutual trade investments as well as a large educational export between the two countries. The two countries have also established an extensive level of trust through their relations during the G20 Summit and both have large investment into multiple anti terror and humanitarian corporations. With both countries being heavily invested in one another this was further reinforced with the development of the King Abdullah Scholarship program which increased educational opportunities for Saudi Arabian students as well as extended the educational opportunities for Australians in Saudi Arabia. For Australians living in Saudi Arabia, many support groups, expat clubs and networking communities have been heavily established throughout the region to improve Australians quality of life.

History 
To the east of Saudi Arabia along the Persian Gulf, are the country's abundant oil fields, that since the 1960s, have made Saudi Arabia synonymous with petroleum wealth. It is among this region that Australians have settled their expat communities, harnessing the need for individuals in the economic, technology and export sector and growing the population of Australians living in Saudi Arabia.

Politics  
Islamic law or the Sharia – is a fundamental religious concept of Islam which is seen as the expression of God's command for Muslims and in application, constitutes a system of duties that are incumbent upon all Muslims by virtue of their religious beliefs.  The Sharia is the primary source of legislation but the actual promulgation of legislation and implementation of policy is often mitigated by more mundane factors, such as political expediency, the inner politics of the ruling family and the influence of intertribal politics, which remain strong in the kingdom.

In June 2017, Bahrain, Saudi Arabia, the United Arab Emirates and Egypt, cut off diplomatic ties and implemented a blockade of Qatar. Negotiations towards a resolution have not been successful and relations with Qatar remain strained.

Women in Saudi Arabia

Legal status for women in Saudi Arabia is extremely different to the likes of Australian politics and law. In Saudi Arabia the legal system requires all women to have a male guardian, this guardian has authority to make a number of decisions on behalf of women, similar to that of a minor. Women were only granted the right to vote in the 2015 elections. This progressive landmark change in law created a monumental shift on the lives of Saudi Arabian women and the stigma behind being a woman in Saudi Arabia. 
 
There was some hesitation to register to vote as there was still a lot of bureaucratic chores that accompanied the registration process with statistics from a 2020 article from news journal ‘Foreign Policy’ that women only makeup 6% of the 1.7 million people electorate.

Living conditions

Compound living
Most expats living in Saudi Arabia find themselves living in Western compounds, this housing is like living in a small self-contained holiday village that can have a range of amenities with anything from multiple pools to restaurants, markets and even shopping malls. Within the compounds the dress is Western, and some compounds ban any form of Saudi dressing.

Generally accommodation on western compounds in Saudi Arabia is reasonable comfortable, quite spacious and can be rather lavish living quarters compared to off compound housing. Most westerners particularly Australian Expats chose to live within these compounds due to the freedom and security, particularly having young children security is a large reason why compound living is so popular. 

Most expats have their accommodation costs paid directly by their employer who will also normally arrange housing, insurance, schools and even a healthcare plan.

Economic overview  
In recent years, Saudi Arabia has had an extremely lucrative economy, it is one of the largest economies in the middle east as its population of around 33.4 million holding nearly 20% of the worlds conventional oil reserves, Saudi Arabia is a lively economy that has until the recent pandemic been thriving.

Australia was ranked number seven among the countries from which Saudi Arabia imported goods. On the other hand, Saudi Arabia's exports to Australia totalled up to $688 million. Of the approximate 5,000 expats over 3,000 are employed in Saudi Arabia as Saudi Arabian needs are well suited to Australian abilities within health, education and specialist areas.

"Saudisation"

Saudization (Arabic: السعودة), officially known as Saudi nationalisation scheme, or Nitgat (Arabic: النطاقات) is the newest policy of the Kingdom of Saudi Arabia implemented by its Ministry of Labor and Social Development, whereby Saudi companies and enterprises are required to fill up their workforce with Saudi nationals up to a certain level yet still encourage a significant expat community.

Bilateral Relations

As Australia's second largest market in the Middle East, Saudi Arabia is an important trading partner for Australia. Australia - Saudi Business ties have expanded with the Australian former Deputy Prime Minister Mark Vaile, former Queensland Premier, Anna Bligh and Australia Post CEO and then Chair of the Council for Australian-Arab Relations, Ahmed Fahour attending the March 2013 Joint Ministerial Commission meeting that saw the signing of a Memorandum of Understanding between the Australia-Saudi Business Council and the Council of Saudi Chambers of Commerce establishing the Saudi Australia Joint Business Council. There are over 5,000 Australian citizens employed in Saudi Arabia, mainly in health, education and other specialist areas. Saudi Arabia's needs are well suited to Australian capabilities. Saudi Arabia has a sound economy with a fast-growing and young population, a well-managed banking system, good infrastructure, and generally low import duties and barriers. Its business community is sophisticated and familiar with Western practices. Austrade is represented in both Riyadh and Jeddah.

Mutual Trade and Investment  
Saudi Arabia is one of Australia's biggest trading partners, in 2019 the two way goods and services trade totalled $1.79 Billion. Saudi Arabia has a significant amount of investments within Australia as their total assets add up to $3.9 billion (2018), Saudi Arabia and Australia are equally as dependent on each other with a range of export services, investments and programs linked between the two nations which enhances the lives of Australians living in Saudi Arabia.

In Saudi Arabia, Educational export is an important factor in the relations between the two as Australia and Saudi Arabia have mutually enjoyed a friendly and cooperative relationship based on extensive trade relations as well as people to people contacts.

With there being such a cultural shift between the two countries it is not uncommon for Saudi Arabian's to export their education. With gender segregation and the difference in education for females being profoundly different to that of Australians, it is sometimes difficult to disconnect between their cultural upbringing and has a severe impact on students and their ability to relate to their peers particularly in a coeducational environment.

Saudi Arabia not only has a substantial market for educational purposes but has a large market for dairy products, vehicle parts and accessories as well as a growing market for fresh vegetables, refined metals and information communication products. Australian and Saudi Arabian business ties have strengthened with the growing number of expats enhancing the economic and bilateral relations between the two countries.

The economy of Saudi Arabia is one of the top twenty economies in the world, and the largest in the Arab world and the Middle East. Saudi Arabia is part of the G20 group of countries  With a total worth of $33.50 trillion, Saudi Arabia has the second most valuable natural resources in the world.
The country has the second-largest proven petroleum reserves, and is the largest exporter of petroleum in the world. It also has the fifth-largest proven natural gas reserves and is considered an "Energy Superpower".

The economy of Saudi Arabia is heavily dependent on oil, and is a member of OPEC. In 2016 the Saudi Government launched its Saudi Vision 2030 to reduce the country's dependency on oil and diversify its economic resources. In the first quarter of 2019, Saudi Arabia's budget has accomplished its first surplus since 2014. This surplus that is accounted for $10.40 billion has been achieved due to the increase of the oil and non-oil revenues.

See also
 
 Australia–Saudi Arabia relations
 Australians in the United Arab Emirates

References

External links
 Australian Business Group of Saudi Arabia

Saudi Arabia
Ethnic groups in Saudi Arabia